Marilyn Chin (陈美玲) is a prominent Chinese American poet, writer, activist, and feminist, as well as an editor and Professor of English. She is well-represented in major canonical anthologies and textbooks and her work is taught all over the world. Marilyn Chin's work is a frequent subject of academic research and literary criticism. Marilyn Chin has read her poetry at the Library of Congress.

Life
She grew up in Portland, Oregon, after her family emigrated from Hong Kong. She received an M.F.A. from the University of Iowa and a B.A. from  University of Massachusetts Her poetry focuses on social issues, especially those related to Asian American
 feminism and bi-cultural identity.

Marilyn Chin has won numerous awards for her poetry, including the United Artists Foundation Fellowship, the Radcliffe Institute Fellowship at Harvard, the Rockefeller Foundation Fellowship at Bellagio, the SeaChange fellowship from the Gaia Foundation, two National Endowment for the Arts grants, the Stegner Fellowship, the PEN Oakland/Josephine Miles Literary Award, five Pushcart Prizes, a Fulbright Fellowship to Taiwan and the Anisfield-Wolf Book Award.

She is featured in several authoritative anthologies, including The Norton Anthology of Modern and Contemporary Poetry, The Norton Anthology of Literature by Women, The Norton Introduction to Poetry, The Oxford Anthology of Modern American Poetry, Unsettling America, The Open Boat and The Penguin Anthology of 20th Century American Poetry.

She was interviewed by Bill Moyers and featured in his PBS series "The Language of Life." Her poem “The Floral Apron” was introduced by Garrison Keillor on the PBS special “Poetry Everywhere."” It was also chosen by the BBC to represent the region of Hong Kong during the 2012 Olympics in London.

Marilyn Chin is professor emerita at the Department of English and Comparative Literature at San Diego State University. In January 2018, she was elected a Chancellor of the Academy of American Poets.

Awards and honors
2020 Poetry Foundation Ruth Lilly Poetry Prize
2019 The American Academy of Arts and Letters Award in Literature 
2018 Academy of American Poets Chancellor 
2014 California Book Awards Poetry Finalist for "Hard Love Province" 
Radcliffe Institute Fellowship at Harvard
Rockefeller Foundation Fellowship at Bellagio
Two National Endowment for the Arts Fellowships
2007 United States Artists Fellowship
The Stegner Fellowship
Five Pushcart Prize
Fulbright Fellowship to Taiwan
The SeaChange Fellowship from the Gaea Foundation
1995 PEN Oakland/Josephine Miles Literary Award

Residencies 
 Civitella Ranieri Foundation
 Yaddo
 MacDowell Colony
 Lannan Foundation
 Djerassi Foundation

Selected bibliography
Poetry
 Dwarf Bamboo Greenfield Review Press, 1987,  
 The Phoenix Gone, the Terrace Empty Milkweed Editions, 1994, ; Milkweed Editions, 2009,  
 Rhapsody in Plain Yellow: Poems W. W. Norton & Company, 2003, 
 Hard Love Province: Poems W. W. Norton & Company, 2014, 
 A Portrait of the Self as Nation: New and Selected Poems W. W. Norton & Company, 2018, 

Fiction
 

Edited Anthologies

Translations
  

Scholarship
Chin's work is the subject of a number of scholarly essays. A recent one explores the ironic voices in "Rhapsody in Plain Yellow" that challenge self-hatred and self colonization.

References

External links

 Marilyn Chin's Official Website
 Essay by Chin on American Poetry
 
 Chin's Profile at Modern American Poetry
 Academy of American Poets

American writers of Chinese descent
Living people
1955 births
Hong Kong poets
American feminists
Poets from Oregon
University of Iowa alumni
American women poets
PEN Oakland/Josephine Miles Literary Award winners
Writers from Portland, Oregon
21st-century American women writers
Hong Kong women activists
21st-century American poets
San Diego State University faculty
Hong Kong women writers
Hong Kong emigrants to the United States
Activists from Oregon